Loes Gunnewijk (born 27 November 1980 in Groenlo) is a Dutch former professional racing cyclist, who rode professionally between 2004 and 2015.

Gunnewijk was a member of the Dutch national team together with Ellen van Dijk, Marianne Vos and Annemiek van Vleuten in the road race at the 2012 Summer Olympics where Vos won the gold medal. Gunnewijk announced her retirement from the sport in May 2015, subsequently completing the Union Cycliste Internationale's Sports Directors Diploma course in November 2015. Between May and the end of 2016, Gunnewijk joined her old cycling team  as a trainee directeur sportif. Since 2017, Gunnewijk has been the head junior women's coach and assistant para-cycling coach for the Dutch cycling national federation KNWU.

Major results

2002
 1st Omloop van Borsele
 2nd Time trial, National Road Championships
 9th Overall Holland Ladies Tour

2003
 1st Stage 9 (ITT) Giro d'Italia Femminile
 3rd Individual pursuit, National Track Championships

2004
 2nd Time trial, National Road Championships
 2nd Overall Ster Zeeuwsche Eilanden
1st Stage 3a
 5th Overall Tour de Feminin – O cenu Českého Švýcarska
 6th Overall Holland Ladies Tour
 7th Tour of Flanders for Women
 9th Overall Novilon Damesronde van Drenthe

2005
 1st Herford Cyclocross
 1st Stage 4 Tour de l'Aude Cycliste Féminin
 2nd Time trial, National Road Championships
 2nd Overall Ster Zeeuwsche Eilanden
 2nd Omloop door Middag-Humsterland
 4th Ronde van Gelderland
 5th Overall Novilon Damesronde van Drenthe
 5th Overall Holland Ladies Tour

2006
 1st Time trial, World University Cycling Championship
 1st  Time trial, National Road Championships
 Tour de l'Aude Cycliste Féminin
1st Stages 1 (TTT) & 3 (ITT)
 1st Stage 4b La Route de France
 2nd Overall Euregio Ladies Tour
1st Stage 2
 2nd L'Heure D'Or Féminine
 3rd Tour of Flanders for Women
 5th Overall Ster Zeeuwsche Eilanden
 6th Overall Holland Ladies Tour
 8th Omloop Het Volk

2007
 6th Overall Gracia–Orlová
 7th Overall Ster Zeeuwsche Eilanden
 9th Omloop Het Volk
 10th Ronde van Gelderland
 10th Durango-Durango Emakumeen Saria

2008
 2nd Chrono Champenois – Trophée Européen
 3rd Time trial, National Road Championships
 6th Omloop door Middag-Humsterland
 7th Overall Holland Ladies Tour
 9th Overall Grande Boucle Féminine Internationale
 9th Omloop van Borsele

2009
 2nd Ronde van Drenthe
 3rd Open de Suède Vårgårda TTT
 4th Overall Ster Zeeuwsche Eilanden
 5th Overall Holland Ladies Tour
1st Mountains classification
 5th Novilon Eurocup Ronde van Drenthe
 6th Trofeo Alfredo Binda-Comune di Cittiglio
 8th Overall Ladies Tour of Qatar
 9th Overall Tour de l'Aude Cycliste Féminin
 9th Drentse 8 van Dwingeloo
 9th Tour of Flanders for Women
 9th Holland Hills Classic

2010
 1st  Road race, National Road Championships
 1st Ronde van Drenthe
 3rd Open de Suède Vårgårda TTT
 5th Overall La Route de France
 8th Overall Iurreta-Emakumeen Bira
 8th Omloop Het Nieuwsblad
 9th Overall Tour de l'Aude Cycliste Féminin

2011
 2nd Overall Energiewacht Tour
 3rd Time trial, National Road Championships
 4th Omloop Het Nieuwsblad
 6th Overall Ladies Tour of Qatar
 8th Overall Holland Ladies Tour
1st Stage 3

2012
 1st Omloop Het Nieuwsblad
 2nd Team time trial, UCI Road World Championships
 3rd Overall Tour Féminin en Limousin
 4th GP Comune di Cornaredo
 5th Overall Energiewacht Tour
 6th Overall Ladies Tour of Qatar
 6th Le Samyn des Dames
 7th Tour of Flanders for Women
 9th Ronde van Drenthe

2013
 2nd Time trial, National Road Championships
 2nd Overall Energiewacht Tour
 2nd EPZ Omloop van Borsele
 3rd Team time trial, UCI Road World Championships
 3rd Acht van Chaam
 4th Overall Belgium Tour
 6th 7-Dorpenomloop Aalburg
 8th Tour of Flanders for Women
 9th Open de Suède Vårgårda
 10th Omloop Het Nieuwsblad

2014
 1st  Overall Santos Women's Cup
1st Stage 1
 4th Gooik–Geraardsbergen–Gooik

2015
 9th Overall Bay Classic Series

General classification results

Classics results timeline

Major championship results

See also

 List of Dutch Olympic cyclists

References

External links

1980 births
Living people
Dutch female cyclists
Cyclo-cross cyclists
Cyclists at the 2012 Summer Olympics
Olympic cyclists of the Netherlands
Dutch cycling time trial champions
UCI Road World Championships cyclists for the Netherlands
Cyclists from Oost Gelre